John Sudnik is a firefighter with the FDNY
, who was promoted to acting Chief of Department, the most senior uniformed member of the Department, on December 10, 2018.  Prior to replacing his predecessor, James E. Leonard, Sudnik had been Chief of Operations.  Sudnik's acting appointment was made permanent on February 27, 2019.

In January 2019 Sudnik announced that, in response to Amazon choosing Long Island as the site of a massive new headquarters, the Department was considering re-opening a fire station, Engine Company 261, that had been closed in 2003, as a cost-cutting measure.

On October 22, 2019, when Sudnik participated in the kickoff of the 37th instance of a large annual food drive, he explained why firehouses were being used as collection points - firefighter's mission was to save lives.

References

Firefighters
Living people
Year of birth missing (living people)
New York City firefighters